Don Bendell (born January 8, 1947) is an American author, rancher, tracker, producer, director, actor, and a former Green Beret. He has published 29 books and assisted in exposing former Atlantic City Mayor Bob Levy's claims of serving as a Green Beret as false.

Bendell was born in Akron, Ohio, and has had his work published in several newspapers and magazines, such as The American Spectator. Bendell is skilled in multiple martial arts, previously owned his own karate schools, and is a 1995 inductee into the International Karate & Kickboxing Hall of Fame.

Bibliography

Fiction

Chief of Scouts series
Chief of Scouts (1995)  
Horse Soldiers (1995)
Colt (1995) (1995)Justis Colt (1995)Matched Colts (1997) Blazing Colts (1999)Coyote Run (1995)Warrior (1995)Eagle (1995)War Bonnet (2002)

Criminal Investigation DetachmentCriminal Investigation Detachment (2006)Broken Borders (2006)Bamboo Battleground (2007)

Strongheart seriesStrongheart: A Story of the Old West (2011)Blood Feather (2013)The Indian Ring (2016)The Rider of Phantom Canyon (2016)

Non-fiction
Crossbow (1990)
The B-52 Overture (1992) 
Valley of Tears (1993)
Snake Eater: Characters in and Stories about the U. S. Army Special Forces in Vietnam (1994) 
VALLEY OF TEARS: Assault Into the Plei Trap Valley (2010) 
Tracks of Hope: A Memoir (2011)

Politics
In November 2016, Bendell spoke at a rally in support of Republican presidential nominee Donald Trump.

In 2018, Bendell ran as a Republican for the Colorado House of Representatives and was narrowly defeated by his Democratic opponent, Brianna Buentello.

References

External links
Official website
Bendell Karate

American science fiction writers
Western (genre) writers
American memoirists
1947 births
Members of the United States Army Special Forces
Living people
United States Army officers
20th-century American novelists
20th-century American male writers
American ranchers
21st-century American novelists
American male novelists
20th-century American non-fiction writers
21st-century American non-fiction writers
American male non-fiction writers
Military personnel from Ohio
Writers from Akron, Ohio
21st-century American male writers